Kilcoy-Murgon Road is a major inland rural road located in Queensland, Australia. The highway runs between its junction with the D'Aguilar Highway at Kilcoy, and its junction with the Burnett Highway at Barambah, Queensland, south of Goomeri. Its length is approximately 105 kilometres (65 miles). The road provides a vital link between Kilcoy and Murgon. The road travels through large forests of pine plantations and travels through the historic timber town of Jimna.

Route description
The route starts off at Kilcoy and is a sealed two-laned road from Kilcoy to Jimna, there are some long windy sections that require some care. The road beyond Jimna is mostly unsealed but is maintained as a good gravel road, that is unfenced in some sections. Tourist attractions along or shortly off the road include Jimna and its surrounds, the heritage-listed Elgin Vale Sawmill and Jimna Fire Tower, plus Yabba Falls near Jimna and Bjelke-Petersen Dam in the north.

List of towns
From north to south
 Jimna
 Manumbar
 Goomeri

History
In January 2013, Cyclone Oswald caused flood damage and many landslides along the road and a partial closure, which took some time to repair.

See also

 List of road routes in Queensland

References

Roads in Queensland
Wide Bay–Burnett
Central Queensland